On the Verge is a 2021 English-language French streaming television TV series created by Julie Delpy and starring Delpy, Elisabeth Shue and Sarah Jones. The series is a production by French company Légende Entreprises for Canal+ and Netflix.

Cast
 Julie Delpy as Justine
 Elisabeth Shue as Anne
 Sarah Jones as Yasmin
 Alexia Landeau as Ell
 Mathieu Demy as Martin
 Troy Garity as George
 Timm Sharp as William
 Giovanni Ribisi as Jerry
 Kai To as Kai
 Christopher Convery as Albert
 Sutton Waldman as Sebastian
 Duke Cutler as Oliver
 Daphne Albert as Sarah
 Larry Weissman as Cookbook Author

References

External links
 
 

2021 American television series debuts
2021 American television series endings
2021 French television series debuts
2021 French television series endings
2020s American comedy-drama television series
Canal+ original programming
English-language Netflix original programming
Television series about families
Television shows set in Los Angeles